Saratoga is an unincorporated community in Saratoga Township, Winona County, Minnesota, United States.

The community is located south of St. Charles; near the junction of State Highway 74 (MN 74) and Winona County Road 10.

Nearby places include St. Charles, Troy, Clyde, Dover, and Chatfield.  Trout Run Creek flows through the community.

References

Unincorporated communities in Minnesota
Unincorporated communities in Winona County, Minnesota